This is a list of notable web television series, or web series, organized alphabetically by name.

Numbers and symbols

 #Adulting
 13 Reasons Why
 The 21 Conspiracy
 The 410

A

 A.I.SHA My Virtual Girlfriend
 Achievement Hunter
 Adulthood (L'Âge adulte)
 The Adventures of a Sexual Miscreant
 Afterworld
 After Trek
 Agents of S.H.I.E.L.D.: Slingshot
 All My Children (2013 revival)
 All-for-nots
 All in the Method
 The Amazing Gayl Pile
 Angel of Death
 The Angry Video Game Nerd
 Animaniacs (2020 revival)
 The Annoying Orange
 Anyone But Me
 Apharan
 Ark
 Arkansas Traveler
 Arrested Development (Season 4)
 Art of the Drink
 Ask a Ninja
 Ashens
 Asur
 A-Teen
 A-Teen 2
 Atop The Fourth Wall
 Average Betty
 Avocado Toast
 The Awesomes

B

 Backpackers
 Baked
 Band Ladies
 The Bannen Way
 Barbie: Life in the Dreamhouse
 Battlestar Galactica: Blood & Chrome
 Battlestar Galactica: Razor Flashbacks
 Battlestar Galactica: The Resistance
 Battlestar Galactica: The Face of the Enemy
 Becoming Human
 Beckinfield
 BedHead
 Bee and Puppycat
 Behind the Music that Sucks
 Best in Miniature
 Betaal
 Bewafaa sii Wafaa
 Big Mouth
 The Big Picture with MovieBob
 Bit Playas
 The Bloody Mary Show
 BloggingHeads
 BoJack Horseman
 The Book of Boba Fett
 The Book of Jer3miah
 Bose: Dead/Alive
 Bosch
 Boygiri
 Boys to Manzo
 Bratzillaz (House of Witchez)
 Bravest Warriors
 Break a Leg
 Breathe
 Broad Appeal: Living with E's
 Brown Girls
 Burning Love
 But I'm Chris Jericho!
 BuzzFeed Unsolved

C

 Canadiana
 Capitol Hill
 Carmilla
 Carpool Karaoke: The Series
 Castlevania
 Casual
 CELL: The Web Series
 Chad Vader
 Chance
 Chateau Laurier
 Chelsea
 Chelsea Does
 Childrens Hospital
 Chop Socky Boom
 Clark and Michael
 Classic Alice
 Class of 2017
 Clutch
 Cobra Kai  
 Codefellas
 CollegeHumor
 Comedians in Cars Getting Coffee
 Coming Out
 The Communist's Daughter
 Community (Season 6)
 Compulsions
 Consolevania
 Copy & Pastry
 Crash Course
 The Crew (2007 webseries)
 The Crew (2021 Netflix series, unrelated to the 2007 webseries)
 The Critic (2000 revival)
 Critical Role
 The Crown
 CTRL
 CyberSquad

D

 Danger 5 (The Diamond Girls)
 Daredevil
 DC Super Hero Girls
 Dead Fantasy
 Death Battle
 Decoys
 The Defenders
 Deleted - The Game
 Detention Adventure
 DeVanity
 Dev DD
 Dhimaner Dinkaal
 Dick Figures
 Difficult People
 Diggnation
 Do Not Track
Don't Hug Me I'm Scared
 Doctor Who: TARDISODES
 Dorm Life
 Dr. Horrible's Sing-Along Blog
 Dr. Tran
 Dragon Age: Redemption
 Dark

E

Eddsworld
Easy to Assemble
Electric City
Eli's Dirty Jokes
Elite
EPIC FU
Epic Chef
Epic Rap Battles of History
Equals Three with Ray William Johnson
Escape to the Movies with MovieBob
Exo Next Door
Extra Credits
Ever After High
Everyone's Famous

F

Fak Yaass
The Falcon and the Winter Soldier
Farscape
Fear the Walking Dead (Webisodes Flight 462, Passage and The Althea Tapes)
Feed Me Bubbe
Five Points
For the Record
Foreign Body
Fred Figglehorn (FRED)
Freddie Wong
Freezerburns
Friends from College
Fu@K I Love U
Fuller House

G

 Game Grumps
 Gandii Baat
 Game of Thrones
 The Game Theorists
 Gemini Division
 Ghost BFF
 The Girls on Film
 Girltrash
 GLOW
 Go-Go Boy Interrupted
 The God & Devil Show
 The Goddamn George Liquor Program
 Goliath
 The Good Fight
 Good Mythical Morning
 Gorgeous Tiny Chicken Machine Show
 Gotham Girls
 Grace and Frankie
 Green Eggs and Ham
 Guidestones
 The Guild
 Gundarr
 Gypsy

H

 H+: The Digital Series
 Half-Life VR but the AI is Self-Aware
 Halo 4: Forward Unto Dawn
 Halo: Nightfall
 Hanazuki: Full of Treasures
 The Handmaid's Tale
 Happy Hour with Elliott Morgan
 Happy Tree Friends
 The Hardy Show
 Haters Back Off
 Havana Elsa
 Hawkeye
 Hazbin Hotel
 Helluva Boss
 Hemlock Grove
 Her Story
 Herne Katha
 Hero Envy
 Hey Lady!
 Hide and Seek, an on-line episode of Eureka
 Hilda
 Home at Last
 Homicide: Second Shift
 Homestar Runner
 Hometown Baghdad
 Horace and Pete
 Hospital Show
 House of Cards
 How to Buy a Baby
 Humans of New York: The Series
 The Hunted
 Husbands

I

 I Heart Vampires
 I Kissed a Vampire
 Imaginary Bitches
 Immersion
 Infinite Ryvius: Illusion (2000)
 Inside Edge
 In Gayle We Trust
 In the Motherhood
 Iron Fist
 Italian Spiderman
 IvoryTower

J

 Jake and Amir
 Jessica Jones
 JourneyQuest
 JustSaying

K

 Karagar
 KateModern
 Kamen Rider Amazons
 Kamen Rider Black Sun 
 Karrle Tu Bhi Mohabbat
 Killer Bean
 Kirill
 Karikku

L

 The Legend of Neil
 The Legend of Korra
 The Legion of Extraordinary Dancers
 Letterkenny Problems
 LG15: The Last
 LG15: The Resistance
 LG15: Outbreak
 Lido TV
 Liza on Demand
 Loki
 LOL
 lonelygirl15
 Lost (Webisodes Missing Pieces)
 Lost in Space (2018 reboot)
 Lore
 The Lost Tomb
 Lucifer (Seasons 4 and 5)
 Luke Cage

M

 Mahou Yuugi (Magical Play)
 Making Fiends
 Malice: The Webseries
 The Man in the High Castle
 Mantecoza
 Marble Hornets
 Marco Polo
 The Marvelous Mrs. Maisel
 Meta Runner
 The Mercury Men
 The Miley and Mandy Show
 The Mimi & Flo Show
 The Mindy Project (Seasons 4 through 6)
 Ming's Dynasty
 Miranda Sings
 The Mandalorian
 Mirzapur
 The Mis-Adventures of Awkward Black Girl
 Mission Backup Earth
 Mister Know-It-All
 Money Heist
 Monster High
 Moon Knight
 Mortal Kombat: Legacy
 Mother Up!
 Mr. Deity
 Mr. Freeman
 Murder in Passing
 My 90-Year-Old Roommate
 My Alibi
 My Life as a Video Game
 MyMusicShow
 My Scene

N

 Narcos The Neddeaus of Duqesne Island NerdTV N1ckola Nostalgia Critic NX FilesO

 The OA Obi-Wan Kenobi Oddbods Old Dogs & New Tricks One Life to Live (2013 revival)
 Orange Is the New Black Orange Juice in Bishops Garden Out With Dad The Outs Ozark OzGirlP

 The Path PANICS peopleWatching Permanent Roommates Petrol PG Porn The Philip DeFranco Show Pillow Talks Pini Pioneer One The Plateaus Polly Pocket Pencilmation Poolside Chats Poor Paul Pop-Up Porno Potter Puppet Pals Power Rangers Dino Fury (Season 2)
 Power Rangers Hyperforce Pretty Dirty Secrets Private Prom Queen The Punisher Pure PwnageQ

 Quarterlife Queen America Queens QuerenciaR

 Ragini MMS: Returns Ragged Isle The Ranch RCVR The Ready Room Reality On Demand Recess Therapy Red Bird Red Table Talk red vs. blue Revenge of the Black Best Friend RhettandLinKast Rich Keeble Vanity Project Riese the Series Romil & Jugal The Room Actors: Where Are They Now? A Mockumentary Rose by Any Other Name... Rostered On Run This Town Series Runaways Running With Violet Ruby Skye PI Robot ChickenS

 Saber Sacred Games Salad Fingers Sanctuary Santa Clarita Diet SamHas7Friends SMBC Theater Scott the Woz Scratch Scrubs interns Sense8 A Series of Unfortunate Events Sex Education Sex/Life Sexy Herpes Shadazzle Shankaboot A Shared House Shit Girls Say Simon's Cat Slo Pitch Sloppy Jones Sofia's Diary Something Remote Sorority Forever Soup of the Day SourceFed Smosh Sneaky Pete Space Janitors Space Riders: Division Earth Special ops Speedie Date Spellfury Squaresville Squad 85 Squid Game Star-ving Star Trek: Discovery Star Trek: Lower Decks Star Trek: Picard Star Trek: Short Treks Star Trek: Strange New Worlds Star Wars: The Book of Boba Fett Star Wars: The Clone Wars (Seasons 6 and 7)
 Star Wars: The Mandalorian Star Wars: Obi-Wan Kenobi Starship Regulars Statler and Waldorf: From the Balcony Step Up: High Water The Strangerhood Stranger Things Street Fighter: Assassin's FistT

 Tabletop Talking Tom and Friends Team Unicorn Teenagers The Test Case Tekzilla This Blows Thug Notes Tiki Bar TV Toyboize Transparent Transformers: Cyber Missions Trenches The Family Man TVF Pitchers TVF TriplingUUrban WolfVValemontThe VariantsVenice: The SeriesVideo Game High SchoolViralVixenVoyage TrekkersWWainy DaysThe Walking Dead (Webisodes Torn Apart, Cold Storage, The Oath and Red Machete)WandaVisionWe Broke UpWeekend Pussy HuntWe Need GirlfriendsWeb TherapyWednesday (Netflix)What If...?Where the Bears AreWHIH NewsfrontWill It Blend?The Writers' BlockWriters  The Wonderful World of Mickey MouseWWE 205 LiveWWE HeatWWE Mixed Match ChallengeWWE NXTWWE SuperstarsWWE VelocityYYeh Meri FamilyYou (season 2)Your Two CentsZZarqaZero PunctuationZoe ValentineZombie College''

References

Lists of internet series